Lomadonta is a genus of moths in the subfamily Lymantriinae. The genus was erected by William Jacob Holland in 1893.

Species
Lomadonta aurago Schultze, 1934 Cameroon
Lomadonta callipepla Collenette, 1961 Congo
Lomadonta citrago Hering, 1926
Lomadonta erythrina Holland, 1893 western Africa
Lomadonta hoesemanni Bryk, 1913 western Africa
Lomadonta obscura Swinhoe, 1904 western Africa
Lomadonta saturata Swinhoe, 1904 southern Nigeria
Lomadonta siccifolium Schultze, 1934 western Africa
Lomadonta umbrata Bryk, 1913 western Africa

References

Lymantriinae